Nanded City is a township located in the south-west of Pune, India. Construction began in 2010 and continues to develop itself with newer housing societies. Satish Magar is the chairman & managing director of the township.

Residential societies

Nanded City has the below residential societies. Names of these societies are based on different aspects of Hindustani classical music.

Asawari - 2 and 3 BHK society with 11 buildings of 22 floors each.
Bageshree - 2 BHK society with 5 buildings of 18 floors each.
Dhanashree - Plot society with 183 plots.
Janaranjani (MHADA) - 1 BHK society with 18 buildings of 5 floors each.
Kalashree - 2.5 BHK society with 5 buildings of 18 floors each.
Lalit - 2.5 BHK society with 6 buildings, 3 with 11 floors and 3 with 22 floors.
Madhuvanti - 2 BHK society with 23 buildings of 11 floors each.
Mangal Bhairav - 1 BHK society with 38 buildings of 11 floors each.
Pancham - 2 BHK society with 4 buildings of 31 floors each.
Rhythm - 26 acre plot society.
Sarang - 2 BHK society with 13 buildings of 11 floors each.
Sargam - 2, 2.5, and 3 BHK society with 7 buildings of 31 floors each.
Shubh Kalyan - 3 BHK society with 4 buildings of 22 floors each.
Sur - 2 and 3 BHK society with 7 buildings of 19 floors each.
Yogashree - 1.5 and 2 BHK society with 5 buildings of 18 floors each.
Rhythm 1,2,3 - The 26 acres of prime land is distributed into 3 sectors - Rhythm I, II and III for Villas/Bungalows. Exclusive 32 Acre Club Harmony Membership

Commercial establishments

Symphony IT Park
Tower B1 - FIGmd, Toll Group
Tower B2 -

Schools
Nanded City Public School - ICSE board
Pawar Public School - CBSE board

Destination Center
A shopping complex having D-Mart, HDFC Bank, Punjab National Bank, Abs Fitness, and other.

Kridangan
A sports complex having a gymnasium, 1 swimming pool, 4 lawn tennis courts, 1 indoor badminton court, 1 skating rink, and 1 open amphitheater.

Other facilities
 Prepaid electrical and water meters
 No annual maintenance charges (forever managed through one-time maintenance charge)
 No annual property tax (being a township)
 Eco-Stream Park

See also
Magarpatta
Nanded

References

Neighbourhoods in Pune
Townships in India